Kailey Ann Leila (born 27 July 1996) is a Canadian-born Guyanese footballer who plays as a defender. She has been a member of the Guyana women's national team.

Early life
Leila has attended the St. Thomas Aquinas Secondary School in Brampton, Ontario.

International career
Leila represented Guyana at the 2012 CONCACAF Women's U-17 Championship qualifying (second CFU round) and the 2012 CONCACAF Women's U-20 Championship qualifying. At senior level, she capped during the 2016 CONCACAF Women's Olympic Qualifying Championship (and its qualification).

See also
List of Guyana women's international footballers

References

1996 births
Living people
Citizens of Guyana through descent
Guyanese women's footballers
Women's association football defenders
Guyana women's international footballers
Place of birth missing (living people)
Soccer players from Brampton
Canadian women's soccer players
Canadian sportspeople of Guyanese descent